Lavu Narendranath is an Indian orthopedic surgeon, medical researcher and the director of Nizam's Institute of Medical Sciences, Hyderabad.

Career 
After graduating in medicine and securing a master's degree (MS), he joined NIMS and worked there till his superannuation as Associate Dean on 31 August 2013, but was asked to continue as the director of the institution. His appointment was unsuccessfully challenged in court but he has been serving the institution since then and major developments are reported during his tenure. He has worked along with A. P. J. Abdul Kalam, renowned scientist and former President of India, in a project for the development of ultra low weight prosthetic limbs for polio-affected persons and amputees. The Government of India awarded him the fourth highest civilian honour of the Padma Shri, in 2005, for his contributions to Indian medicine.

References 

Recipients of the Padma Shri in medicine
Year of birth missing (living people)
Medical doctors from Andhra Pradesh
Telugu people
Indian orthopedic surgeons
Indian medical researchers
20th-century Indian inventors
Living people
20th-century Indian medical doctors
20th-century surgeons